Marian Canney (née Gallagher, Jan. 18, 1921 - Sept. 9, 2019) was a faculty member at Georgetown Visitation Preparatory School. She was also well known for her visibility as widow of a Korean war soldier, John J. Canney Jr.

Early life and education 
Canney was born Marian Elisabeth Gallagher and lived in Washington, D.C. with her parents and two sisters. She started Georgetown Visitation Preparatory School, first graduating from high school in 1938 before continuing on to their junior college and graduating from there in 1940.

Canney attended Trinity College before her marriage, then returned to Georgetown University for a graduate degree in theology and philosophy.

Career 
In 1971, Canney joined the faculty at Georgetown Visitation Preparatory School, the school she attended growing up. She became the Chair of the Religion Department. She assisted the head of the school during her career as well.

She retired in 2017.

Marriage and widowhood 
Canney married Captain John Joseph Canney Jr., of Cambridge, Massachusetts, in January 1943 in Washington, D.C. John J. Canney, who was five years Marian's senior, was killed in action on November 28, 1950, during the Korean War. The Navy Cross was awarded to him after his death.

Influences 
Canney influenced authors Anne B. Keating, Joseph Hargitai, Joseph R. Hargitai, who wrote The Wired Professor: A Guide to the World Wide Web in College Instruction.

References

Trinity Washington University alumni
Georgetown University Graduate School of Arts and Sciences alumni
Schoolteachers from Washington, D.C.
American women educators
1921 births
2019 deaths
21st-century American women